Maciej Korzym (born 2 May 1988) is a Polish footballer who plays as a forward for Barciczanka Barcice.

Career
He also played for the Poland national under-21 football team.

References

External links
 

1988 births
Living people
Sportspeople from Nowy Sącz
Polish footballers
Association football forwards
Poland youth international footballers
Poland under-21 international footballers
Legia Warsaw players
GKS Bełchatów players
Sandecja Nowy Sącz players
Korona Kielce players
Podbeskidzie Bielsko-Biała players
Górnik Zabrze players
Ekstraklasa players
I liga players
IV liga players